Boldyn Byambadorj (born April 6, 1991 in Bulgan Province, Mongolia) is a cross-country skier from Mongolia. He will compete for Mongolia at the 2014 Winter Olympics in the 15 kilometre classical race.

Byambadorj was also selected to carry the Mongolian flag during the opening ceremony.

See also
Mongolia at the 2014 Winter Olympics

References 

1991 births
Living people
Cross-country skiers at the 2014 Winter Olympics
Mongolian male cross-country skiers
Olympic cross-country skiers of Mongolia
People from Bulgan Province
Asian Games medalists in ski orienteering
Ski-orienteers at the 2011 Asian Winter Games
Asian Games bronze medalists for Mongolia
Medalists at the 2011 Asian Winter Games
Competitors at the 2015 Winter Universiade